Karaca Pasha was the Beylerbeyi of Rumelia during Mehmed the Conqueror's reign and played a role in the conquest of Constantinople. His nickname was dayı, meaning "uncle" in Turkish, as he was the brother of the mother of Aladdin, one of Mehmed's sons. He made a reputation for himself in the Battle of Varna during the reign of Murad II. He died during the siege of Belgrade in 1456. Karacabey District in Bursa is named after him.

References

Sources 

 

1456 deaths
Ottoman governors of Rumelia
15th-century people from the Ottoman Empire
Ottoman people of the Byzantine–Ottoman wars
15th-century Ottoman military personnel